Universal Channel was a television channel specializing in movies and television series in the thriller, drama, comedy, crime and investigation genres. It was owned by Universal Networks International. This channel was launched in Singapore on 1 July 2008 along with Sci Fi Channel (Asia), now Syfy Universal (Asia).

On the first on-air broadcast launch saw the official slogan was It's the People Who Make Us. On July 24, 2010, the second on-air look with colorful visual ident theme and the official  slogan was Characters Welcome as well as the channel converting from 4:3 aspect ratio to 16:9 widescreen picture format since February 8, 2011. It brought the latest of new series, including two Asian TV premiere series, as well as returning to first seasons of almost all programs already aired.

On January 28, 2014, the Universal Channel refreshed itself alongside other transformations. Among the changes under the rebrand included the channel aligning itself with the international logo and slogan 100% Characters. The channel brought the Same Day or Express from the U. S. telecast with selected programs.

After nine years of broadcasting, Universal Channel along with Syfy ceased broadcasting at midnight, July 1, 2017, in the rest of the Asia. In Malaysia and Sri Lanka  the channel discontinued a day earlier. The channel programmed with a finale episode of Shades of Blue on that day, an ending with the season one finale "One Last Lie" before going off-the-air. Most of the programs of Universal Channel were moved to DIVA, but on 1 January 2020, DIVA and E! discontinued after twenty-two years of broadcast.

Operating channels
 Universal Channel Asia HD  - SG/HK/MY/PHP/JKT feed; available on HD format in selected Asian countries
 Universal Channel Asia - same as the Asian feed; available on SD format in Indonesia, Malaysia and Sri Lanka
 Universal Channel Philippines - same as the Asian feed but with local advertisements.
 Universal Channel Taiwan - same as the Asian feed with Chinese subtitles; available on HD format

Final Programming

Shows
 American Gladiators
 Animals Unleashed
 Australian Gladiators
 Bad Robots
 Bates Motel
 Bent 
 Bullseye
 Caught on Camera
 Chicago Fire
 Chicago P.D.
 Cold Case
 Criminal Minds
 Crusoe
 The Dead Zone
 The Event
 Flashpoint
 Greek
 Grimm
 House
 I Survived a Japanese Game Show
 Ironside (2013)
 Just for Laughs: Gags
 Keith Barry: Brain Hacker
 Law and Order Franchise
 Law & Order
 Law & Order: Criminal Intent 
 Law & Order: Los Angeles 
 Law & Order: Special Victims Unit
 Law & Order: UK 
 The Librarians
 Life
 Magic Man 
 Motive
 Million Dollar Money Drop 
 Minute to Win It
 Monk 
 Ninja Warrior UK 
 The Office
 Outsourced
 Penn & Teller: Fool Us
 Prank Science
 The Pretender
 Profiler
 Psych
 Quarterlife
 Royal Pains
 Same Name
 Sea Patrol
 Shades of Blue
 Shattered 
 The Tonight Show with Jay Leno
 Tricked
 Whitney
 Wizard Wars

Movies
 1000 to 1
 Addicted To Love
 The American President
 Back to the Future trilogy
 Bourne Movies
 The Bourne Identity
 The Bourne Legacy
 The Bourne Supremacy
 Billy Madison
 Bringing Down The House
 Columbus Circle
 Evan Almighty
 The Fast and the Furious
 2 Fast 2 Furious
 Fast and Furious
 Final Recourse
 The Flintstones in Viva Rock Vegas
 Flipped
 The Gourmet Detective
 Happy Gilmore
 Killer Reality
 Mr. Wrong
 The Nightmare Nanny
 The Perfect Man
 Possessed by Evil
 Shadow Witness
 Snow White: A Deadly Summer
 Time of Death
 Up Close & Personal
 Willed to Kill

Specials
 AFI Lifetime Achievement Award: A Tribute to Mike Nichols
 Miss Universe 2008

See also
 Universal Channel in various countries

References

External links
 
 On Screen Asia Article

Television channels and stations established in 2008
Television channels and stations disestablished in 2017
Mass media in Southeast Asia
Defunct television channels
Television stations in Hong Kong